is a Japanese shōjo manga series written and illustrated by Tomoko Nishimura. It was serialized in Shogakukan's Ciao magazine from January 2006 to January 2014.

The manga has been adapted into an anime series produced by SynergySP and Shogakukan Music & Digital Entertainment, which was originally broadcast in Japan on TV Tokyo and AT-X from April 4, 2010, to April 4, 2011.

Plot
 (voiced by Mana Ogawa) is a kind, level-headed girl who aims to be the best, coolest student council president of her high school class. However, three troublemaking boys are always causing her grief, and she has a one-sided crush on one of the boys, Ushio Tōjō.

Games
All Gokujō!! Mecha Mote Iinchō video games were published by Konami for the Nintendo DS and none of them was released outside Japan.

References

External links
 
TV Tokyo anime website - 2012 archive 
Konami video game profile - 2018 archive 

2009 anime television series debuts
Japanese children's animated comedy television series
Manga series
Shogakukan franchises
Shogakukan manga
Shōjo manga
School life in anime and manga
Romance anime and manga
TV Tokyo original programming